No Way Jose is a 2015 American comedy-drama film. Adam Goldberg directed the film from a screenplay that he co-wrote with Sarah Kate Levy. It stars Adam Goldberg, Ahna O'Reilly, Pat Healy, Emily Osment and Gillian Jacobs. The premiere of the movie in the United States was on July 7, 2015.

Cast
Adam Goldberg as Joseph "José" Stern
Ahna O'Reilly as Dusty Morrison 
Pat Healy as Lawrence
Emily Osment as Summer Stern
Gillian Jacobs as Penny
Eric Siegel as Gabe
Anna Belknap as Kate
Greg Pritikin as Mickey
Kit Willesee as Shy Performer

Marketing
On May 7, 2015, Sony Pictures Entertainment released the first teaser trailer for the movie on YouTube.

References

External links
 

2015 comedy-drama films
2015 films
American comedy-drama films
2015 comedy films
2010s English-language films
2010s American films